Akash Ongshoto Meghla is an 2022 Indian Bengali-language drama film. written and directed by Joydeep Mukherjee. The film Rudranil Ghosh, Rahul Banerjee, Basabadatta Chatterjee, Ankita Chakraborty and Devdut Ghosh in lead roles. The film was theatrical release on 5 August 2022.

Cast 
 Rudranil Ghosh as Rasam
  Rahul Banerjee as Anirban
 Basabadatta Chatterjee as Anandi
 Ankita Chakraborty as Alpana
 Angel Ghosh as Prabhas Mukherjee
  Kaushik Kar as Alok
  MD Ahmad as Devabrat Bose
 Tarang Banerjee as Party worker
 Arpita Vanik as The lady of the balcony

References

External links 

Bengali-language Indian films
2022 films
Indian drama films